Sveio is a municipality in Vestland county, Norway. Sveio is a border district that is sometimes considered to be located in the traditional district of Haugalandet since it is located on the Haugalandet peninsula, but it is also considered to be in the traditional district of Sunnhordland since it is located in southern Hordaland county.  The administrative centre of the municipality is the village of Sveio. Other villages in the municipality include Auklandshamn, Førde, Våga, and Valevåg.

The  municipality is the 290th largest by area out of the 356 municipalities in Norway. Sveio is the 165th most populous municipality in Norway with a population of 5,775.

Sveio is the site of the Ryvarden Lighthouse which marks the western entrance to the Hardangerfjorden. The lighthouse is automated and the old keepers house and building have now been converted into art galleries, the Flókemuseum, and a cafe.  The composer Fartein Valen lived much of his life in Valevåg in northern Sveio. Valenheimen, the house he lived in is open to the public and the Fartein Valen Festival is held annually in Sveio.

The Triangle Link bridge-tunnel network is based in northern Sveio, connecting the islands to the north to the mainland. The southern entrance to the Bømlafjord Tunnel is located along the European route E39 highway, just south of the village of Valevåg.

General information

The municipality of Sveio was established in 1865 when the part of Finnås municipality located south of the Bømlafjorden (population: 2,227) and the Vikebygd part of the municipality of Fjelberg (population: 1,062) were joined as the new municipality of Sveen (later the spelling was changed to Sveio). On 1 January 1902, the Vikebygd area (population: 1,092) was separated from Sveio to form its own municipality.

During the 1960s, there were many municipal mergers across Norway due to the work of the Schei Committee. On 1 January 1964, Sveio (population: 1,697) was merged with the neighboring municipality of Valestrand (population: 1,216), the western half of the municipality of Vikebygd (population: 471), and a small part of the municipality of Skjold (population: 24). The part of Skjold was transferred from Rogaland county to Hordaland county on the same date.

Name
The municipality (originally the parish) is named after the old Sveio farm, since the first Sveio Church was built there in the Middle Ages. The name is identical with the word sviða which means a "clearing made by burning". Before 1912, the name was written Sveen.

Coat of arms
The coat of arms was granted on 19 February 1982. The arms show a white or silver fleur-de-lis on a red background. The arms are derived from the historic arms of Jon Gauteson from Sveio, who lived around the year 1500. His family became Norwegian nobility in 1591, and he was the first in his family to use this symbol as part of his arms.

Churches
The Church of Norway has two parishes within the municipality of Sveio. It is part of the Sunnhordland prosti (deanery) in the Diocese of Bjørgvin.

Geography

The municipality is located on the mainland of Norway on the western coast of the county on the Haugalandet peninsula, facing the North Sea to the west. The entrance to the Hardangerfjorden lies along the northern side of the municipality, and the smaller Ålfjorden lies along the eastern border of the municipality. Sveio's southern border is also the county border, bordering the town of Haugesund and the municipality of Tysvær to the south, the municipality of Vindafjord to the east (across the Ålfjorden), and the island municipalities of Bømlo and Stord to the north (across the Hardangerfjorden). The lakes Vigdarvatnet and Stakkastadvatnet lie in the southern part of the municipality, crossing into the neighboring municipalities. The Ryvarden Lighthouse is located on a small point, along the Hardangerfjorden.

Government
All municipalities in Norway, including Sveio, are responsible for primary education (through 10th grade), outpatient health services, senior citizen services, unemployment and other social services, zoning, economic development, and municipal roads. The municipality is governed by a municipal council of elected representatives, which in turn elect a mayor.  The municipality falls under the Haugaland og Sunnhordland District Court and the Gulating Court of Appeal.

Municipal council
The municipal council of Sveio is made up of 25 representatives that are elected to four year terms. The party breakdown of the council is as follows:

Mayor
The mayors of Sveio (incomplete list):
2015–present: Jorunn Skåden (Ap)
2011-2015: Ruth Grethe Eriksen (FrP)
2003-2011: Jorunn Skåden (Ap)
1999-2003: Olav Haugen (KrF)
1992-1999: Magnus Skåden (Ap)

Notable residents 
 Einar Økland (born 1940 in Sveio) a Norwegian poet, playwright, essayist and children's writer
 May Britt Vihovde (born 1958 in Sveio) a politician and former Member of Parliament
 Sigbjørn Apeland (born 1966) scientist and musician, plays organ and harmonium; raised in Sveio
 Bjørn Berge (born 1968 in Sveio) a Norwegian guitarist and blues artist
 Grutle Kjellson (born 1973 in Sveio) bassist and vocalist in the progressive black metal band Enslaved
 Agnes Ravatn (born 1983) author, columnist and journalist; lived in Valevåg 
 Cecilie Pedersen (born 1990 in Førde) a Norwegian football striker

References

External links
Municipal fact sheet from Statistics Norway 
Welcome to Sveio
Sveio kommune website

 
Municipalities of Vestland
1865 establishments in Norway